The New England Air Museum (NEAM) is an American aerospace museum located adjacent to Bradley International Airport in Windsor Locks, Connecticut. The museum consists of three display hangars with additional storage and restoration hangars. Its collections include aircraft ranging from early flying machines to supersonic jets, as well as engines, and other pieces of flight-related equipment. Significant aircraft include

 the Silas Brooks balloon basket - the oldest surviving American-built aircraft
 the Sikorsky VS-44A - the sole remaining American-built commercial trans-oceanic four-engine flying boat
 the Goodyear ZNPK-28 Blimp Control Car - one of only two surviving K-class control cars in the world.

The museum library has approximately 6,000 aviation books, approximately 20,000 periodicals, approximately 10,000 technical manuals, approximately 21,000 photographs, nearly 8,000 slides, over 200 pieces of artwork, over 1,200 prints, and approximately 500 engineering drawing and blueprints.

The mission of the New England Air Museum is to present the story of aviation, the human genius that made it possible and the profound effects that it has had on the way in which we live.

History
The museum began when a group of Pratt & Whitney employees formed the Connecticut Aeronautical Historical Association to save a biplane built by Louis Bancroft. While the airplane would later be destroyed in a fire, the group continued. The first display building, an inflatable dome, was erected in 1967.

In 1981, the first current building was built after a tornado destroyed the museum's previous location by Route 75 in 1979. The museum has since added a restoration hangar in 1989, a storage building in 1991, a military hangar in 1992, a 58th Bomb Wing Hangar in 2003, and a storage hangar in 2010.

The museum was renovated in 2017 with the addition of a mezzanine in two of the hangars to provide views of the aircraft from above. At the same time, a new heating and air conditioning system and LED lighting were installed.

Exhibits 

Exhibits include the history of Sikorsky Aircraft, computer-based flight simulators, and the 58th Bombardment Wing Memorial with the centerpiece being a restored B-29A.  Additionally, there are exhibits on early French aviation, the Tuskegee Airmen, the Kosciuszko Squadron, New England Women in Aviation, and the 57th Fighter Group.

Aircraft on display

 AeroVelo Atlas – Partial section
 Bell AH-1S Cobra
 Bell UH-1B Iroquois 62-02550
 Blériot XI
 Boeing B-29A Superfortress 44-61975 Jack’s Hack
 Burnelli CBY-3 Loadmaster
 Chanute Herring Glider – Replica
 Chance Vought XF4U-4 Corsair 80759
 Curtiss Model D – Replica
 de Havilland C-7 Caribou 62-4188
 Doman LZ-5
 Douglas A-3B Skywarrior 142246
 Douglas A-26C Invader 43-22499 Reida Rae
 Douglas DC-3
 Goodyear ZNP-K blimp control car
 Gee Bee Model R replica
 Grumman E-1B Tracer 147217
 Eastern FM-2 Wildcat 74120
 Grumman F6F-5K Hellcat 79192
 Grumman HU-16E Albatross 7228
 Heath LNB-4 Parasol
 Kaman HH-43F Huskie
 Kaman K-16B
 Kaman K-225 N401A
 Kaman SH-2F Seasprite 161905
 Laird LC-DW 300 'Solution'
 Lazor-Rautenstrauch LR-1A
 Lockheed Model 10-A Electra 1052
 Lockheed F-104C Starfighter 56-901
 Marcoux-Bromberg R-3 Special
 Martin RB-57A Canberra 52-1488
 McDonnell Douglas F-4D Phantom II 66-0269
 Nixon Special
 North American B-25H Mitchell 43-4999 Dog Daze
 North American F-100A Super Sabre 52-5761
 North American P-51D Mustang 44-72400 – Racer configuration
 Northrop F-89J Scorpion 52-1896
 Pioneer Flightstar MC
 Pratt-Read LNE-1
 Republic P-47D Thunderbolt 45-49458 Norma
 Republic RC-3 Seabee
 Rutan Quickie
 Sikorsky R-4B Hoverfly 43-46503
 Doman LZ-1A 43-45480
 Sikorsky S-39B
 Sikorsky S-51 9602
 Sikorsky XH-39
 Sikorsky HH-52A Seaguard 1428
 Sikorsky CH-54B Tarhe 69-18465
 Sikorsky VS-44A Excambian

Under restoration

 Douglas DC-3
 Fairchild-Republic A-10A Thunderbolt II
 Lockheed TV-2 Shooting Star 138048
 Kaman HOK-1

See also
List of aerospace museums

References

Bibliography

 Hunt, Leslie. Veteran and Vintage Aircraft. New York: Taplinger Publishing Co., Inc., 1971. .
 Ogden, Bob. Great Aircraft Collections of the World. New York: Gallery Books,  1986. .

External links

 NEAM Official Site
 New England Air Museum Photos of aircraft and aviation related exhibits at the New England Air Museum in Windsor Locks, CT

Aerospace museums in Connecticut
Windsor Locks, Connecticut
Museums in Hartford County, Connecticut
Museums established in 1959
1959 establishments in Connecticut